The 2020 LNFA season is the 26th season of American football in Spain.

Badalona Dracs are the defending champions.

Competition format
For the 2020 season, ten teams joined the league. Valencia Firebats and Granada Lions resigned to their place, while L'Hospitalet Pioners replaced Santiago Black Ravens, relegated from the previous season.

The teams were divided into two groups of five, according to geographical criteria. All teams play ten games during the regular season: two games (home and away) against each other team in their group, plus two inter-group games (against one team of each other group).

At the end of the regular season, the best three teams in each group qualify for the playoffs. Final position in the aggregate table will determine seeding for the playoffs.

Tiebreakers
If two or more teams are tied at the end of the competition, the ranking of teams in each group is based on the following criteria:
 Highest percentage of wins in games between tied teams.
 Lowest percentage of points against in games between tied teams.
 Highest difference between points scored and points against in games between tied teams.
 Lowest percentage of points against in all the games.
 Highest difference between points scored and points against in all the games.
 Lowest percentage of sent off players in all the games.
 Drawing of lots.

Stadia and locations

Ten teams entered the LNFA Serie A, the top-tier level of American football in Spain.

Regular season

Group North

Group South

Playoffs

Copa de España
Prior to the season, the Copa de España was played between the 10 teams that registered in the competition. Badalona Dracs successfully defended the title, achieving their fifth Cup overall.

References

External links
Spanish American Football Federation
Fieldgoal.eu

Liga Nacional de Fútbol Americano
2020 in Spanish sport
2020 in American football